Ginkgo CADx is a multi platform (Windows, Linux, Mac OS X) DICOM viewer (*.dcm) and dicomizer (convert different files to DICOM). Ginkgo CADx is licensed under LGPL license, being an open source project with an Open core approach. The goal of Ginkgo CADx project is to develop an open source professional DICOM workstation.

Ginkgo CADx also has a professional version with a private license model called Ginkgo CADx Pro.

About Ginkgo CADx 
The main features of this software are:

 Fully functional DICOM viewer and DICOM workstation with PACS support (C-FIND, C-GET, C-MOVE, C-STORE...).
 Dicomizator: Ginkgo CADx can convert from JPEG, PNG, GIF, TIFF images and PDF documents to DICOM files.
 Cross-platform (Windows, Linux, Mac OS X).
 Standard DICOM tools: rulers, angle, window level, cinema mode...
 Supports numerous DICOM modalities as CT, MR, ECG, PET, XC, SC, XA, MG...
 Intuitive graphical interface customizable with user profiles.
 Easily integrated with third party systems using HL7 messages, DICOM and IHE compliant workflows.

Ginkgo CADx is written in C++, has a plug-in architecture, and is cross-platform by way of CMake. It is also based on common open source libraries like VTK, ITK, and wxWidgets.

History 
Ginkgo CADx project started in 2009 with the aim to create an interactive, universal, homogeneous, open-source and cross-platform CADx environment. Developed by MetaEmotion, the first public version (2.0.2.0) of Ginkgo CADx was released in 2010.

The Ginkgo CADx team have collaborated with:
 Sacyl Public healthcare system of Castilla y León.
 GNUmed team. Packaging and compiling Ginkgo CADx for Ubuntu, Debian, Fedora and SUSE.

References

External links 
 

Computer vision software
Free 3D graphics software
Free software programmed in C++
Free health care software
Free DICOM software
Software that uses wxWidgets
Software that uses VTK